Mordellistena inaequalis is a beetle in the genus Mordellistena of the family Mordellidae. It was described in 1856 by Mulsant.

References

inaequalis
Beetles described in 1856